The first Blair ministry lasted from May 1997 to June 2001. After eighteen years in opposition, Labour ousted the Conservatives at the May 1997 election with a 179-seat majority. The Prime Minister, Tony Blair, who turned 44 years old days after leading Labour to victory, was the youngest Prime Minister of the twentieth century.

Blair quickly wiped away memories of the troubled Labour governments led by Harold Wilson and James Callaghan in the 1960s and 1970s as the economic recovery continued and unemployment continued to fall. While other developed countries, notably Japan, were hit by a financial crisis during Blair's first term in office, the British economy remained strong.

In September 2000, however, protests against fuel prices intensified across the country and the Leader of the Conservative Party William Hague exploited the situation by pointing out to voters just how much fuel prices had risen under Labour. This sparked a brief Conservative lead in the opinion polls – the first time in eight years – but once the fuel shortages and consequent protests ended, Labour led the opinion polls once more.

Blair was so confident of re-election that he called a general election for 3 May, but this was postponed until 7 June due to the foot and mouth crisis. This led to a brief crisis in the agricultural and tourism industries, but did little to shake a still-strong economy and the electorate responded by re-electing Blair with an only slightly reduced majority.

Cabinet

Changes
July 1998 – Margaret Beckett becomes Lord President of the Council and Leader of the House of Commons. The Baroness Jay of Paddington becomes Lord Keeper of the Privy Seal, Leader of the House of Lords and Minister for Women. Stephen Byers becomes Chief Secretary to the Treasury. Ann Taylor becomes Chief Whip, which is now a cabinet position. Jack Cunningham becomes Cabinet Office Minister and Chancellor of the Duchy of Lancaster. Nick Brown becomes Agriculture Minister. Alistair Darling becomes Social Security Secretary. Peter Mandelson moves from being Minister Without Portfolio to being Trade and Industry Secretary. John Reid becomes Transport Minister, which is no longer a cabinet position (although Reid will continue attending cabinet meetings). Ivor Richard, Harriet Harman, David Clark and Gavin Strang leave the cabinet. The President of the Board of Trade is no longer a title used by the Trade Secretary.
 October 1998 – Alun Michael becomes Welsh Secretary. Ron Davies leaves the Cabinet.
December 1998 – Peter Mandelson is dismissed from the cabinet over a secret home loan he received from Geoffrey Robinson. Stephen Byers becomes Trade & Industry Secretary. Alan Milburn becomes Chief Secretary to the Treasury.
 May 1999 – John Reid becomes Scottish Secretary. Donald Dewar leaves the cabinet.
 July 1999 – Paul Murphy becomes Welsh Secretary. Alun Michael leaves the cabinet.
October 1999 – Andrew Smith becomes Chief Secretary to the Treasury. Geoff Hoon becomes Defence Secretary. Alan Milburn becomes Health Secretary. Peter Mandelson returns to the cabinet as Northern Ireland Secretary. Mo Mowlam becomes Cabinet Office Minister and Chancellor of the Duchy of Lancaster. Gareth Williams becomes Attorney General. John Morris, George Robertson, Jack Cunningham and Frank Dobson leave the cabinet.
January 2001 – Peter Mandelson is dismissed as Northern Ireland Secretary and is succeeded by John Reid. Helen Liddell enters the cabinet and succeeds John Reid as Scottish Secretary.

List of ministers

Prime Minister, the Cabinet Office and non-departmental ministers

Departments of state

Law officers

Parliament

Whips

References

External links

British ministries
Government
1990s in the United Kingdom
2000s in the United Kingdom
1997 establishments in the United Kingdom
2001 disestablishments in the United Kingdom
First ministry
Ministries of Elizabeth II
New Labour
Cabinets established in 1997
Cabinets disestablished in 2001